USS Delaware may refer to:

, was a 24-gun frigate built in 1776 and captured by the British in 1777
, was a 20-gun ship purchased in 1798
, was a 74-gun ship of the line, launched in 1820 and burned in 1861
, was a side-wheel steamer built in 1861 and decommissioned in 1865
, was a screw steamer renamed from Piscataqua in 1869
, was a battleship commissioned in 1910 and scrapped in 1924
SP-467 (later AT-5S and YT-111) served in the Navy from 1917 to 1923. Although officially known as SP-467, she was erroneously listed under her merchant name of Delaware on various occasions.
, a  commissioned in 2020

See also
 , an auxiliary  launched in 1961 currently in ready reserve since 1989.

 The Captain from Connecticut, a novel by C. S. Forester largely set aboard a fictional USS Delaware during the War of 1812.

United States Navy ship names